Znamenka is a rural locality (a selo) in Vosmomartovsky Selsoviet, Yermekeyevsky District, Bashkortostan, Russia. The population was 45 as of 2010. There are 2 streets.

Geography 
Znamenka is located 38 km south of Yermekeyevo (the district's administrative centre) by road. Imeni 8 Marta is the nearest rural locality.

References 

Rural localities in Yermekeyevsky District